James Edward Geringer (born April 24, 1944) is an American politician who was the 30th Governor of Wyoming, serving from 1995 to 2003.

Early life and education
Geringer was born and raised on a farm in Wheatland, Wyoming. His father, Gottlieb Geringer, was a Volga German from Lauwe (now Yablonovka, Saratov Oblast) in the Russian Empire, and his mother, Edla Malin (née Johnson), was of Swedish descent.  He attended Kansas State University and was a member of Triangle Fraternity, earning a degree in mechanical engineering.  He served for ten years in the United States Air Force before retiring. He briefly worked at a power generating station in Wheatland before purchasing a farm.

Politics
In 1982, Geringer successfully ran as a Republican for a seat in the Wyoming House of Representatives.  After serving there for six years, he won a seat in the Wyoming Senate from the 3rd district. In 1994, Geringer was elected as Wyoming's governor.

Geringer was generally a conservative throughout his political career. As governor, he helped pass laws that regulated class action lawsuits, reformed bankruptcy laws, toughened crime laws, legalized charter schools, and lowered taxes. However, he broke with the Republican Party in supporting environmental rulings and the Equal Rights Amendment.

In 1997, Governor Geringer called for a boycott of America Online after Sondra London posted a series of murder confessions sent to her from "Happy Face Killer" Keith Jesperson, protesting that he found the items to be offensive. Although London voluntarily removed the pages in question, AOL banned her from the AOL domain, which in turn prompted an outpouring of support from all over the World Wide Web, including multiple offers of free server space.

After serving as governor, he joined Redlands, California based ESRI  as director of policy and public sector strategies.

Geringer is one of the founding governors of Western Governors University (WGU) and is currently chairman of the WGU Board of Trustees.

References

External links
 Wyoming State Archives
 

|-

|-

1944 births
American Lutherans
American people of German-Russian descent
American people of Swedish descent
Farmers from Wyoming
Republican Party governors of Wyoming
Kansas State University alumni
Living people
Republican Party members of the Wyoming House of Representatives
People from Wheatland, Wyoming
United States Air Force officers
Western Governors University people
Republican Party Wyoming state senators